Lawless Alan (born February 2, 2000) is an American professional stock car racing driver. He competes full-time in the NASCAR Craftsman Truck Series, driving the No. 45 Chevrolet Silverado for Niece Motorsports. He previously competed part-time in the ARCA Menards Series West for Bill McAnally Racing in 2019 and 2020.

Racing career

In 2018, Alan competed in the NASCAR Whelen All-American Series for his family team, Dasher Lawless Racing.

After joining Bill McAnally Racing part-time in 2019, Alan returned to the team for what was to be a full season in the 2020 ARCA Menards Series West. After the first four races of the season, he and his No. 12 car stopped attempting races for unknown reasons. He did not run any more NASCAR or ARCA races for another team for the remainder of the season until the 12w was run by British driver Alex Sedgwick.

Alan joined Reaume Brothers Racing to make his Truck Series debut in their No. 34 truck at the Daytona Road Course in 2021. Reaume Brothers Racing signed Alan for an additional five races at Nashville, Pocono, Watkins Glen, Bristol, and Talladega during the 2021 Truck schedule. He also joined Niece Motorsports for two races.

In 2022, he committed to the full Truck Series schedule in the No. 45 for Niece.

Motorsports career results

NASCAR
(key) (Bold – Pole position awarded by qualifying time. Italics – Pole position earned by points standings or practice time. * – Most laps led.)

Craftsman Truck Series

 Season in progress 
 Ineligible for series points

K&N Pro Series East

ARCA Menards Series
(key) (Bold – Pole position awarded by qualifying time. Italics – Pole position earned by points standings or practice time. * – Most laps led.)

ARCA Menards Series West

References

External links
 
 Official profile at Niece Motorsports
 

Living people
2000 births
Racing drivers from California
Racing drivers from Los Angeles
NASCAR drivers
ARCA Menards Series drivers